Marianne Joan Elliott-Said (3 July 1957 – 25 April 2011), known by the stage name Poly Styrene, was an English musician, singer-songwriter, and frontwoman for the punk rock band X-Ray Spex.

Early life
Poly Styrene was born Marianne Joan Elliott-Said in 1957 in Bromley, Kent, and brought up in Brixton, London. Her mother, who raised her alone, was a Scottish-Irish legal secretary. Her father was a Somali-born dock worker, although Poly Styrene used to tell the press that he was a dispossessed Somali aristocrat.

As a teenager, Styrene was a hippie. When she was 15 she ran away from home with £3 in her pocket, and hitchhiked from one music festival to another, staying at hippie crash pads. Thinking of this as a challenge to survive, her adventure ended when she stepped on a rusty nail while bathing in a stream and had to be treated for sepsis.

Having been 'an itinerant traveller, alternative fashion designer and a failed pop-reggae singer', she saw Sex Pistols perform at the Pier Pavilion in Hastings on her nineteenth birthday, 3 July 1976, and decided to form the punk band X-Ray Spex.

Music career

Demo and first single
Styrene recorded her first demo album in 1975, when she was 18 years old. Her manager enlisted Ted Bunting to produce the record.

In 1976, Styrene released her first single under her real name, Mari Elliott. Titled "Silly Billy", it was a reggae track, with some touches of the then popular ska style. Her daughter Celeste has called it 'similar to Althea and Donna, who she really liked'. She co-wrote the B-side "What a Way" with the record's producer, Falcon Stuart. The single came in a GTO Records sleeve.

X-Ray Spex

After watching a very early gig by the Sex Pistols in an empty hall on Hastings Pier, playing a set of cover songs, she was inspired to put an ad in the music papers for 'young punx who want to stick it together' to form a band. From this, she became the singer with X-Ray Spex, Poly Styrene, a name she chose from the 'Yellow Pages' when she was 'looking for a name of the time, something plastic.' She was described by Billboard as the "archetype for the modern-day feminist punk"; because she wore dental braces, rebelled against the archetypal female sex object of the 1970s, sported a gaudy Dayglo wardrobe, and was of mixed race. She was "one of the least conventional frontpersons in rock history, male or female". They launched their debut single in 1977.

In 1978, after a gig in Doncaster, South Yorkshire, Styrene had a vision of a pink light in the sky and felt objects crackling when she touched them. Thinking she was hallucinating, her mother took her to the hospital where Marianne was misdiagnosed with schizophrenia, sectioned, and told she would never work again. She was diagnosed with bipolar disorder in 1991.

Solo career
After the original line-up of X-Ray Spex broke up in 1979, Poly Styrene recorded a solo album, Translucence, in 1980. The album abandoned X-Ray Spex's loud guitar work for a quieter and more jazzy sound that has since been described as foreshadowing later work by Everything but the Girl. In 1986, she released the EP God's & Godesses  on the Awesome record label. A New Age solo album, Flower Aeroplane, followed in 2004.

She described herself as "an observer, not a suffering artist writing from tortured experiences. I was playing with words and ideas. Having a laugh about everything, sending it up."

In 2007, Styrene was invited to the Concrete Jungle festival in Camber Sands, by her friend Goldblade's John Robb where she and the gathering's organiser, Symond Lawes, agreed to initiate a 30-year celebration of X-Ray Spex's debut album, Germfree Adolescents. They decided to hold a live show at the Camden Roundhouse, which was a sell-out event on 6 September 2008. A live album/DVD of this event, Live @ The Roundhouse London 2008, was released in November 2009 on the Year Zero label by Future Noise Music.

She made a guest appearance at the 2008 30th anniversary concert of Rock Against Racism in Victoria Park, London, performing "Oh Bondage Up Yours!" with guest musicians Drew McConnell (of Babyshambles and Helsinki) and 'Flash' David Wright playing saxophone. That same year, she dueted with Goldblade's John Robb on a remix of Goldblade's "City of Christmas Ghosts".

In March 2009, Styrene joined other members of PRS for Music in criticising Google for allegedly not paying a fair share of royalties to musicians. This followed Google's removal of millions of videos from YouTube because of a royalties dispute with the organisation.

NME.com announced on 29 October 2010 that Poly Styrene was to release a solo album titled Generation Indigo, produced by Martin Glover (aka Youth from Killing Joke), in March 2011. She released a free download of "Black Christmas" in November 2010. Inspired by a Los Angeles killing spree of a man dressed as Santa Claus, "Black Christmas" was written in collaboration with her daughter, Celeste.

Styrene announced "Virtual Boyfriend" as the first single from the new album Generation Indigo via Spinner Music, as well as the launch of her new website. "Virtual Boyfriend" was released on 21 March 2011, and featured an animated promotional video directed by Ben Wheele. Generation Indigo was released on 28 March 2011, via Future Noise Music. The album received critical acclaim, including a perfect 10 out of 10 score in Artrocker magazine, and 8 out of 10 in The Daily Telegraph newspaper. Generation Indigo was also chosen as Album of the Day on UK radio station BBC 6 Music. It was released in the US on 24 April 2011, the day before her death.

"Ghoulish" was the first posthumous single to be released from Generation Indigo, and was backed by a remix from Hercules and Love Affair.

New York magazine's music journalist Nitsuh Abebe described her singing style with X-Ray Spex as "a bold, keening yelp" and "fierce but fiercely feminine."

The band U2 paid tribute to Styrene during the "HerStory" video tribute to notable women in 2017 for the 30th anniversary of The Joshua Tree during a performance of "Ultraviolet (Light My Way)" from the band's 1991 album Achtung Baby. In 2023, Rolling Stone ranked Poly Styrene at number 195 on its list of the 200 Greatest Singers of All Time.

Personal life
In 1983, Styrene was initiated into the Hare Krishna movement and recorded at their recording studios while living as a devotee at Bhaktivedanta Manor. She lived as a Hare Krishna convert in Hertfordshire and London from 1983 to 1988. Styrene was a vegetarian.

In 1995, Styrene's solo work was put on hold when she suffered a fractured pelvis after being knocked down by a fire engine.

In March 2009, Styrene took part in the inaugural Instigate Debate night. The night's theme was modern day consumerism. Other current issues were also discussed.

She had a daughter, Celeste Bell-Dos Santos, and lived alone in St Leonards, East Sussex.

Death
In February 2011, in an interview published in The Sunday Times magazine, which largely focused on her past and present relationship with her daughter, Celeste, Styrene revealed that she had been treated for breast cancer, and that it had spread to her spine and lungs. She died of metastatic breast cancer on 25 April 2011, at the age of 53.

Documentary and biography 
Author Zoë Howe and Styrene's daughter, Celeste Bell, co-authored a biography of Styrene that was published in November 2018. The book, titled Day Glo: The Poly Styrene Story, was published in the United States in September 2019.

In 2021, Styrene was the subject of a documentary, Poly Styrene: I Am a Cliché, that was initially crowd-funded until the project got some investment from Sky Arts. Like the biography, the documentary was co-written by Howe and Bell, with Celeste Bell also directing with Paul Sng and providing the narration with Ruth Negga. The documentary coincided with the 40th anniversary of the release of the first X-Ray Spex album, Germfree Adolescents. "This film will be a celebration of the life and work of my mother, an artist who deserves to be recognised as one of the greatest frontwomen of all time; a little girl with a big voice whose words are more relevant than ever" Bell said. The world premiere of I Am a Cliché took place online on 27 February 2021, with the film being released on digital formats on 5 March 2021 and broadcast by Sky Arts on 6 March 2021.

Solo discography

Albums
 Translucence (United Artists, 1980)
 Flower Aeroplane (2004)
 Generation Indigo (Future Noise Music, 2011)

EPs
 God's & Godesses (Awesome, 1986)

Singles
 "Silly Billy"/"What A Way" – as Mari Elliott (GTO, 1976)
 "Talk in Toytown"/"Sub Tropical" (United Artists, 1980)
 "City of Christmas Ghosts" – Goldblade featuring Poly Styrene (Damaged Goods, 2008)
 "Black Christmas" (2010)
 "Virtual Boyfriend" (2011)
 "Ghoulish" (2011)

References

External links

Poly Styrene's official website
Poly's Punky Party, personal site

1957 births
2011 deaths
20th-century Black British women singers
21st-century Black British women singers
Black British rock musicians
Converts to Hinduism
Deaths from breast cancer
Deaths from cancer in England
English feminists
English Hare Krishnas
English Hindus
English people of Irish descent
English people of Scottish descent
English people of Somali descent
English punk rock singers
English rock singers
English women singer-songwriters
Feminist musicians
Musicians from Kent
Musicians from London
People from Brixton
People from Bromley
People with bipolar disorder
Women in punk
Women new wave singers
Women punk rock singers
X-Ray Spex members